"I Want You" is a song by American recording artist CeeLo Green, from his third studio album The Lady Killer. The song was released via digital download and CD single on June 5, 2011. French TV channel Canal+ featured a live concert on Nov. 12, 2010, a few days after the release of the album, in which a version close to the later single was performed. The single version of the track is a slightly different remix of the track, and has been issued under the title "I Want You (Hold On to Love)", to distinguish it from the album version. The single version incorporates a sample of Saint Tropez's 1978 track "Hold on to Love". The music video for the song was premiered on May 27 through Cee Lo Green's official YouTube channel. The song is featured on the Compilation album Now 79 despite only peaking at #90 on the UK Singles Chart, although it peaked at #27 on the UK R&B Chart.

Background
While touring with the all-female backing band Scarlet Fever, Green came up with the idea for the song. Fuse likened the song to Janet Jackson's "I Want You" as it similarly "reached back to an earlier era," also having "old-fashioned strings for "sweetening" all over it" in a related fashion.

Live performances
He premiered the song live on November 11, 2010, as part of the Symmetry Live Concert Series at the W Hotel in Midtown Manhattan, New York. The song is part of his setlist for his 2011 arena tour. Green also performed the song on late night BBC music show Later...with Jools Holland while he was in the UK. He also performed the song on The Graham Norton Show on May 20, 2011.

Track listing
Digital Download
 "I Want You (Hold On to Love)" – 3:30
 "I Want You (Hold On to Love)" (Original Jack Splash Mix) – 5:04
 "I Want You (Hold On to Love)" (Redlight Remix) – 3:26
 "I Want You" – 3:36

 UK Promotional CD Single Set
 CD1
 "I Want You" – 3:36
 "I Want You" (Instrumental) – 3:36

 CD2
 "I Want You (Hold On to Love)" – 3:30
 "I Want You (Hold On to Love)" (Original Jack Splash Mix) – 5:04
 "I Want You (Hold On to Love)" (Redlight Remix) – 3:26
 "I Want You (Hold On to Love)" (Instrumental Edit) – 3:30

Credits and personnel
Lead vocals – Cee Lo Green
Bass – Pino Palladino
Producers – Jack Splash
Lyrics – Callaway, VLJ, Jack Splash
Label: Elektra Records

Charts

Release history

References

CeeLo Green songs
2011 singles
Songs written by CeeLo Green
Songs written by Fraser T. Smith
Song recordings produced by Fraser T. Smith